Davyhurst may refer to:
 Davyhurst, Western Australia
 Davyhurst Gold Mine, a gold mine in Western Australia